The 2017–18 Newcastle Jets W-League season was their tenth season in the W-League, the premier competition for Association football women's football in Australia. The team played home games at McDonald Jones Stadium and the club was managed by Craig Deans.

Players

Current squad

Transfers in

Transfers out

Contract extensions

Managerial staff
As of July 2015, the managerial staff for the Newcastle Jets FC consists of:

Squad statistics

Competitions

W-League

League table

Results summary

Results by round

Fixtures
 Click here for season fixtures.

Finals series

References

External links
 Official Website

Newcastle Jets FC (A-League Women) seasons
Newcastle Jets